Hudson Taylor (1832–1905) was a British Protestant missionary

Hudson Taylor may also refer to:

Hudson Taylor (group), Irish folk duo
Hudson Taylor (wrestler) (born 1987), American wrestler and LGBT activist